Fotbal Club Fair Play București, commonly known as Fair Play București, or simply Fair Play, is a Romanian women's football club based in Bucharest, Romania. Fair Play București was founded on 29 April 2003 and currently plays in the Liga I, first tier of the Romanian women's football system.
From the 2020–2021 season, the team evolves with the FCSB emblem.

Season by season

Current squad

Club officials

Board of directors

 Last updated: 19 January 2019
 Source:

Current technical staff

 Last updated: 19 January 2019
 Source:

References

External links
 Official website
 

Women's football clubs in Romania
Football clubs in Bucharest
Sport in Bucharest
Association football clubs established in 2003
2003 establishments in Romania